M-8 highway (previously known as R-11 regional road) is a Montenegrin roadway.

History
The R-11 regional road on this route was built in 2010.

In January 2016, the Ministry of Transport and Maritime Affairs published bylaw on categorisation of state roads. With new categorisation, R-11 regional road was categorised as M-8 highway.

Major intersections

References

M-8